Donington is a civil parish in Shropshire, England.  It contains 17 listed buildings that are recorded in the National Heritage List for England.  Of these, two are at Grade II*, the middle of the three grades, and the others are at Grade II, the lowest grade.  The parish contains the village of Donington, countryside to the north, and RAF Cosford.  Most of the listed buildings are houses, farmhouses and farm buildings.  The other listed buildings include a church, a cross and a tomb in the churchyard, a holy well, and a block in RAF Cosford.


Key

Buildings

References

Citations

Sources

Lists of buildings and structures in Shropshire